G vs E (later retitled Good vs Evil) is an American supernatural comedy-drama television series that had its first season air on USA Network during the summer and autumn of 1999. For the second season the series moved to Sci Fi in early 2000. The series stars Clayton Rohner, Richard Brooks and Marshall Bell.

G vs E pitted a group of agents who are assigned to "the Corps", a secret agency under the command of Heaven, against the "Morlocks", a group of evildoers from Hell.

The series has a 1970s retro-hip style that is similar to Quentin Tarantino's Pulp Fiction. The show is fast-moving and harkens back to the blaxploitation films of the 1970s. It also mixes spy-fi elements with the end of the millennium Zeitgeist of the late 1990s.

Plot
Chandler Smythe (Clayton Rohner) is murdered on his 35th birthday. He is then recruited as an agent of the Corps and becomes a partner to Henry McNeil (Richard Brooks). Henry was killed in the 1970s and still dresses like Shaft. The Corps, best described as God's police force on Earth, has the mission of locating citizens who have made a Faustian-style bargain with the agents of evil. When the Corps find a lost soul, they must decide whether to rehabilitate them or eliminate them from existence if they are beyond redemption.

Overseeing their patrols are Decker (Googy Gress) and Ford (Marshall Bell), who give the weekly assignments. Deacon Jones acts as series narrator and appears on screen as "the Deacon". The Deacon is the head of the Corps as shown in the last episode and all Corps agents are ranked beneath him. However he is not god. God is never seen on the show.

Chandler's teenage son Ben, played by Tony Denman, occasionally appears. Chandler guides him in subtle ways.

The Corps itself functions much like any police force does, with various departments and a city-based structure. Paramedics, supply officers, spies, intelligence agents, forensic specialists, therapists, and munitions experts are all on hand to help with cases. They operate throughout the world in various cities. Chandler and Henry work out of the Hollywood station. They are based at Ravenswood, a high-rise art-deco establishment, which also doubles as purgatory.

All the agents of the Corps have gone through a violent, mortal death, but merely being alive again does not render them immortal. They can "die" again, and they face immediate judgement upon dying, which may be a problem for those who have not completed their redemption. Injury can happen to them, as can all the usual mental anguish that mortals suffer. Corps agents have no magical powers to give them an advantage over the opposition. Another limitation is that agents of the Corps are not allowed to have sexual relations with others, due to the fact that sleeping with a Morlock will turn an agent into one. They also cannot overtly contact their friends and family from before they died.

The Corps battle with two types of foes: Faustians and Morlocks. The Faustians are ordinary people who have made a deal with the forces of evil and bask in the fortunes that such a deal allows them on Earth. The Morlocks are Faustians who have died their mortal death and are now the ground troops for the dark side, evil's equivalent to the Corps. They are identifiable as people who have suddenly become sarcastic and courageous to extreme degrees. In addition, mirrors reveal the true nature of Morlocks; their reflections are twisted and demonic. Unlike Corps agents, Morlocks have superhuman resilience, and they cannot be easily killed.

Both Morlocks and the Corps have double agents planted in each other's ranks.

Episodes

Season 1 (1999)

Season 2 (2000)

Reception
Noel Holston of the Star Tribune gave the series 2.5 stars out of 5.

References

External links
 

USA Network original programming
Syfy original programming
1999 American television series debuts
2000 American television series endings
1990s American comic science fiction television series
2000s American comic science fiction television series
Television series by Universal Television
Works based on the Faust legend
2000s American comedy-drama television series
2000s American supernatural television series
1990s American supernatural television series
1990s American comedy-drama television series